WCAM (1590 AM) is a radio station licensed to Camden, South Carolina, United States, broadcasting a Classic country format. The station is currently owned by Kershaw Radio Corp. and features programming from CNN Radio.

References

External links

CAM
Classic country radio stations in the United States
Radio stations established in 1948
1948 establishments in South Carolina